Myra Gale Lewis Williams ( Brown; born July 11, 1944) is an American author, best known for her controversial marriage at the age of 13 to rock and roll musician Jerry Lee Lewis, who was her first cousin once removed and was 22 at the time. She co-wrote the book Great Balls of Fire: The Uncensored Story of Jerry Lee Lewis (1982), which was adapted into the film Great Balls of Fire! (1989). In 2016 she published her memoir, The Spark That Survived.

Life and career 
Myra Gale Brown was born on July 11, 1944, in Vicksburg, Mississippi, the daughter of Lois (née Neal) and J.W. "Jay" Brown. The Browns later had a son, Rusty Brown (b. 1954). In 1949, the family moved to Memphis, Tennessee, when J.W. Brown took a job with Memphis Gas, Light and Water, where he worked as a lineman. When J.W. Brown was injured on the job, he decided to start a band. He sought out his cousin, Jerry Lee Lewis, who was also an unknown musician at the time. J.W. Brown played electric bass, and Lewis played piano and sang. They went on to make rock and roll history, recording hit singles on Sun Records. In 1956, Lewis moved in with J.W. Brown and his family.

On December 12, 1957, at the age of 13, Myra Brown married Jerry Lee Lewis, then 22, in Hernando, Mississippi. When Lewis arrived in London for a 37-date tour in May 1958, Brown revealed to a reporter at the airport that she was his wife. Lewis asserted that Brown was 15 years old and was his wife of two months. However, it was discovered that she was only 13, and that they had been married for five months. This caused an uproar and after a few dates the tour was cancelled. By the time they returned to Memphis, it had been discovered that Brown was not only Lewis' wife, she was also his first cousin once removed. In addition, Lewis had not yet divorced his previous wife, Jane Mitcham. After Lewis finalized his divorce from Mitcham, he remarried Brown on June 4, 1958. The scandal over the marriage destroyed Lewis' promising rock and roll career, although he subsequently found success in country music.

By 1970, Lewis' drug addiction, alcoholism, and infidelity took a toll on their marriage. Brown filed for divorce on the grounds of adultery and abuse, stating that she had been "subject to every type of physical and mental abuse imaginable." Their divorce was finalized on December 9, 1970. They had two children, Steve Allen Lewis (1959–1962), who drowned at age three, and daughter Phoebe Allen Lewis (b. 1963). Phoebe Lewis-Loftin later became her father's manager and lived at his ranch in Nesbit, Mississippi until 2012, when he married Judith Brown, the ex-wife of his first cousin once removed, Rusty Brown (Myra Gale's brother).

Shortly after her divorce, Brown married Pete Malito, the detective she had hired to trail Lewis and document his infidelities, and moved to Atlanta, Georgia. The marriage lasted a year and a half. After they divorced, Brown worked as a receptionist to support her daughter as a single parent.

Brown hired writer Murray Silver to co-write a book that was meant to be her autobiography, but after a publisher's editing it became Great Balls of Fire: The Uncensored Story of Jerry Lee Lewis. The book was originally released in October 1982 by William Morrow and Company. It was adapted into the 1989 film Great Balls of Fire!, starring Dennis Quaid as Lewis and Winona Ryder as Brown. Brown was paid $100,000 for her story, but was resentful that she was not consulted for the script or casting of the film despite being promised. The producers did not want Brown or Lewis involved with the film, but she visited the Memphis set anyway. Although Brown found the actors to be talented and friendly, she was not satisfied with the book or the film. She had wanted to tell the story of a woman surviving difficult circumstances and inspire women to understand their own strengths, so she published her memoir, The Spark That Survived, in 2016. The book details her tumultuous marriage to Lewis and how she built a new life for herself after their divorce.

Since 1980, Brown has enjoyed success as a real estate agent in Atlanta. She married her third husband, Richard Williams, in 1984, and joined his Century 21 Real Estate office. She became a licensed broker in 1984, and is a recipient of the Million Dollar Life Time Award 2003. Now known as Myra Lewis Williams, she resides in Duluth, Georgia with her husband; they own a real estate company.

She is shown being interviewed in the Ethan Coen directed 2022 documentary film Jerry Lee Lewis: Trouble in Mind.

Books 
 1982: Great Balls of Fire: The Uncensored Story of Jerry Lee Lewis
 2016: The Spark That Survived

References

External links 
 Myra Lewis on IMDb
 Myra Williams on All Atlanta Properties

1944 births
Living people
American memoirists
American real estate brokers
American women memoirists
Child marriage in the United States
Writers from Louisiana
People from Vicksburg, Mississippi
21st-century American women